Nate Riles is a retired professional football player that played in the Canadian Football League.

High school career
Riles attended Archbishop Hoban High School where he won multiple OHSAA track and field titles. This includes a team state title.

College career
Riles played at Ohio Northern University where he was first team all-OAC. He also played in the 1998 Aztec Bowl all-star game.

Professional career
Riles signed with the Arizona Cardinals for the 1999 season, but was cut during training camp.

He spent part of the 2000 season with the Frankfurt Galaxy, but was ultimately cut.

He spent the later part of the 2001 season with the Winnipeg Blue Bombers as an injury replacement after having been previously cut earlier that season.  He had a game-saving interception to secure the division title for the Blue Bombers during that season.

References

Living people
Players of American football from Ohio
Ohio Northern Polar Bears football players
Winnipeg Blue Bombers players
Year of birth missing (living people)